Wilhelm Mayer-Gross (January 15, 1889 – February 15, 1961  ) was a German-British psychiatrist and professor. He was one of the founders of the British school of psychiatry.

Early life and education 
He was born in Bingen am Rhein, Germany, however in 1933 he moved to England. He was one of the disciples of Franz Nissl.

Career in Psychiatry

Personal life

References

1889 births
1961 deaths
German psychiatrists
People from Bingen am Rhein
German emigrants to the United Kingdom